Sabean or Sabaean may refer to:

Sabaeans, ancient people in South Arabia
Sabaean language, Old South Arabian language

Sabians, name of a religious group mentioned in the Quran, historically adopted by:
Mandaeans, Gnostic sect from the marshlands of southern Iraq claiming John the Baptist as their most important prophet
Sabians of Harran, astral religion from Harran (Upper Mesopotamia) associated with Hermeticism and other forms of pagan philosophy

See also
Sabian Cymbals, a Canadian-Armenian cymbal manufacturing company
Sabian (disambiguation)